Night Song is a 1948 American drama film directed by John Cromwell and starring Dana Andrews, Merle Oberon and Ethel Barrymore.

Plot
Wealthy San Francisco socialite Cathy Mallory is entranced by the music of blind nightclub pianist Dan Evans. He is bitter and resents a lady's attempt to become his patron.

Bandleader Chick Morgan informs Cathy that Dan has quit. Cathy arranges to meet Dan at the beach and introduces herself as Mary Willey, a woman of limited means who is also blind. They begin a romantic relationship and Dan explains how he lost his sight in an automobile accident.

To continue the ruse, Cathy and longtime companion Mrs. Willey rent an inexpensive apartment. Dan is persuaded to resume writing a piano concerto. Cathy sponsors a $5,000 prize for a contest without telling him, confident Dan's music will win. After the music wins the contest, it is to be performed at Carnegie Hall by the famed pianist Arthur Rubinstein.

Dan uses the money to undergo an operation in New York that restores his vision. At the contest, he meets Cathy and is attracted to her. He enjoys his newfound sight, spending time with her, but when he listens to the concert, it stirs memories of Mary. He advises Chick to inform Cathy that he is returning to Mary. He and Chick take the train while Cathy and her aunt fly through the night. When he arrives at the apartment, he hears Mary playing his music. He walks in, sees her and smiles. Her aunt watches approvingly from the kitchen as they embrace.

Cast

 Dana Andrews as Dan Evans
 Merle Oberon as Cathy Mallory / Mary Willey
 Ethel Barrymore as Miss Willey
 Hoagy Carmichael as Chick Morgan
 Arthur Rubinstein as himself
 Eugene Ormandy as himself
 Jacqueline White as Connie
 Donald Curtis as George
 Walter Reed as Jimmy
 Jane Jones as Mamie

Production
The film's working titles were Counterpoint and Memory of Love. RKO borrowed Dana Andrews from Samuel Goldwyn's company for the project.

Andrews wore special contact lenses that made his eyes appear damaged and limited his eyesight.

Scenes were shot in San Francisco, Trancas Beach and Lake Arrowhead, California and in various locations in New York City. Because of logistical problems at Carnegie Hall, the entire concert was filmed on a soundstage. Andrews reprised his role in a May 29, 1950 Lux Radio Theatre broadcast costarring Joan Fontaine.

Reception
In a contemporary review for The New York Times, critic Bosley Crowther panned the film's "incredibly mawkish plot" and added: "Our old friend, the young musician who has a great concerto chasing through his mind but can't get it down on paper because—well, something's eating on him, is back again ... and, so far as this reviewer sees things, neither he nor his concerto are improved. As a matter of fact, for our money, they are both worn uncomfortably thin in comparison to previous incarnations, and neither is long for this world. ... [T]he music, the prize concerto—well, that is really the thing which puts Night Song in the spotlight as baldfaced and absolute sham. For this scrappy and meaningless jangle by Leith Stevens is good for nothing more than an excuse for filming the fiddles, the drums and the batteries of horns."

The film recorded a loss of $1,040,000.

References

External links
 
 
 
 

1948 films
1948 romantic drama films
American black-and-white films
American romantic drama films
Films about blind people
Films about classical music and musicians
Films about composers
Films directed by John Cromwell
Films scored by Leith Stevens
Films set in New York City
Films set in San Francisco
1940s English-language films
1940s American films